Welcome, or No Trespassing is a Soviet movie by Elem Klimov made in 1964. It is a satirical comedy about the excessive restrictions that children face during their vacation in a Young Pioneer camp, imposed by their masters.  Most of the actors are children, while the protagonist is the director Dynin, played by Yevgeniy Yevstigneyev. The film was selected to be screened in the Cannes Classics section of the 2015 Cannes Film Festival.

Plot 
In a Soviet Young Pioneer camp, Dynin, the administrator is afraid that the children may succumb to harmful accidents and that he will be deemed responsible. He believes that accidents happen when formal rules are violated. Hence, he believes, everything must be done strictly according to formal instructions and regulations. One boy, Kostya Inochkin, (Viktor Kosykh) breaks one of the cardinal rules by swimming out alone to an island instead of swimming in the specially designated swimming area, supervised by staff. As a result, Inochkin is expelled from camp and is sent home. Inochkin is afraid that if his grandmother, with whom he lives, discovers that he has been expelled, she will die from sorrow, so instead of going home he returns to camp illegally. He hides but is discovered by some of the other children, who start helping him to stay, outsmarting the adults. Adults are added to the plot later and also oppose Dynin's strict regime.  Finally Dynin is removed from office and expelled to the town. The film's final scenes show the joy of freedom without Dynin's restrictions, kids and adults swim and even unrealistically jump over the river (although this is presumably a fantasy). The film also makes jokes about a quip popular in Nikita Khrushchev's time - "corn - queen of fields".

Cast
 Viktor Kosykh as Kostya Inochkin
 Yevgeniy Yevstigneyev as Comrade Dynin, head of Pioneer Camp
 Arina Aleynikova as pioneer leader Valia
 Ilya Rutberg as gym teacher
 Lidiya Smirnova as doctor
 Aleksei Smirnov as steward pioneer of Pioneer Camp

History 
In the middle of the making, there was a cable to stop filming, but it was still finished. The movie released to screen soon after dismissal of Nikita Khrushchev as a party leader. According to some sources this allowed the film to be screened. Others say that the leader himself allowed the movie. 13.4 million viewers saw it in the USSR, and the movie received a positive critical acclaim. In UK the movie had the title No Holiday for Inochkin.

References

Notes
100 Great Russian Movies, Moscow, 2006

External links

 Welcome, or No Trespassing (with English subtitles)

1964 films
1964 in the Soviet Union
Russian black-and-white films
Russian comedy films
Russian political satire films
1964 comedy films
Soviet black-and-white films
Soviet comedy films
Films directed by Elem Klimov
Films set in Russia
Films set in the Soviet Union
Films shot in Krasnodar Krai
Films shot in the North Caucasus
Mosfilm films
1960s Russian-language films